Flavor  or flavour is either the sensory perception of taste or smell, or a flavoring in food that produces such perception.

Flavor or flavour may also refer to:

Science
Flavors (programming language), an early object-oriented extension to Lisp
Flavour (particle physics), a quantum number of elementary particles related to their weak interactions
Flavor of Linux, another term for any particular Linux distribution; by extension, "flavor" can be applied to any program or other computer code that exists in more than one current variant at the same time

Film and TV 
Flavors (film), romantic comedy concerning Asian-Indian immigrants in America

Music

Artists and bands
Flavor Flav (born 1959), former rap/hip-hop promoter and current reality television actor
Flavour N'abania (born 1983), Nigerian singer-songwriter
 Flavor (band), minor hit with "Sally Had A Party" in 1968

Albums
Flavours (album), 1975 album by The Guess Who
Flavors (album), by American R&B girl group Tiffany Affair

Songs
"Flavor", 1994 song by the Jon Spencer Blues Explosion from their album Orange
"Flavors", a song by Gomez from their 2000 compilation album Abandoned Shopping Trolley Hotline
"Flavor", 2003 song by Every Little Thing from their album Many Pieces
"Flavor" (Iyanya song), 2012 single by Iyanya from his album Desire
"Flavor" (Tori Amos song), 2012 single by Tori Amos from her album Gold Dust

See also 
Flava (disambiguation), for the slang pronunciation of the word
Deliciousness (TV series), an American comedy clip show